The 1875 Meath by-election was fought on 17 April 1875.  The byelection was fought due to the death of the incumbent Home Rule MP, John Martin.  It was won by the Home Rule candidate Charles Stewart Parnell.

References

1875 elections in the United Kingdom
April 1875 events
By-elections to the Parliament of the United Kingdom in County Meath constituencies
1875 elections in Ireland